Lucrezia Di Siena (fl. 1564), was an Italian stage actress.   She is known as the first identified female actor in Europe since antiquity. 

She signed a signature for an acting contract by a Commedia dell'arte theatre company in Rome on 10 October 1564, in which she is stated to be able to sing, do declamation and play music. This is the first time any professional actress is mentioned in Italy since antiquity and the first time any actress known by name to perform in Commedia dell'artre. All other members of the company were men. 

She is assumed to have been a former courtesan, a cortigiana onesta, a common background for the first generation of actresses in Italy: this was a good background for an actress because courtisans of that class were normally instructed in singing, declamation, music and dance, subjects otherwise rarely attainable for women, and the fact that she was noted with no last name in combination with the honorary title Domina (a common way of address for courtesans), supports this assumption.

After this, actresses became common in Italy, and she was followed only three years later by Vincenza Armani and Barbara Flaminia.

References

Commedia dell'arte
16th-century Italian actresses
Italian stage actresses
Italian courtesans